For the 2006 FIFA World Cup qualification, there were two scheduled inter-confederation play-offs to determine the final two qualification spots to the 2006 FIFA World Cup.

Qualified teams
The four teams participating were:

Format
The draw for the order in which the two matches were played was held on 10 September 2005 during the FIFA Congress in Marrakech, Morocco.

The ties themselves were not drawn, but were allocated by FIFA as:
 CONCACAF Fourth Round Fourth Place v AFC Fourth Round winner
 CONMEBOL Fifth Place vs OFC Third Round winner

Matches

CONCACAF v AFC

|}

Trinidad and Tobago won 2–1 on aggregate and qualified for the 2006 FIFA World Cup.

CONMEBOL v OFC

1–1 on aggregate. Australia won 4–2 on penalties and qualified for the 2006 FIFA World Cup.

Goalscorers 
There were 5 goals scored in 4 matches, for an average of 1.25 goals per match.

1 goal

  Mark Bresciano
  Salman Isa
  Chris Birchall
  Dennis Lawrence
  Darío Rodríguez

References 

Inter-confederation Playoffs